Diosbelys Hurtado (born September 4, 1973 in Santiago, Cuba) is a Cuban-Spanish boxer and former NBA, IBA and WBA Light Welterweight(super lightweight ) Champion.

Amateur career
Amateur Record: 221-20
1990 Represented Cuba at the World Junior Championships in Lima, Peru as a Featherweight. His results were:
 Defeated Bo Hum Baik (Korea) RSC-1
 Defeated Paata Gvasalia (URS) 5-0
Lost to Alan Vaughan (England) 16-19
1994 Competed at the Cuban Nationals. His results were:
 Defeated Joel Casamayor
 Defeated Julio Gonzalez

Professional career
Hurtado, known as "The Oriental Kid", began his professional career in 1994. He won the NBA title by beating Dezi Ford by 10th-round TKO. In 1997, he challenged WBC Welterweight title holder Pernell Whitaker but was TKO'd in the 11th round by Whitaker with Hurtado leading on all three judges' cards.  In 1998, he fought Kostya Tszyu for the interim WBC Light Welterweight title.  The fight featured a dramatic 1st round, in which Hurtado went down once and Tszyu went down twice.  Tszyu won the fight via TKO in the 5th round. On January 4, 2002, he captured the IBA Light Welterweight title from Ricky Quiles then in his next match he won the Vacant WBA Light Welterweight title with a KO win over Randall Bailey.  He then lost the 2 belts in his first defence to Vivian Harris via 2nd-round TKO.  Having retired from boxing in 2004, he returned to the ring in December 2007, winning 2 unanimous decision's in a row over Rafael Chiruta and Eugen Stan, both of Romania.

Comeback
Hurtado came back on April 3, 2009 to beat two-time world title challenger Arturo Morua by Split-Decision to win the vacant WBO Latino Welterweight title, Hurtado was in control until he was caught off balance and knocked down in the 1st round. Hurtado was cut over his right eyebrow and Morua on top of his forehead in the 5th round due to a clash of heads after that Moura had control (due to the profuse bleeding getting into Hurtado's eye) until the 6th round when Hurtado took back control and kept it until the 12th round when Moura would rally to take the round. The scores were 114-113 and 114-113 for Hurtado and 113-114 for Moura.

On June 12 Hurtado defeated Manuel Garnica by UD to retain his WBO Latino title. He returned on June 3, 2011 and defeated journeyman Raul Asencio by knockout in the fifth round and subsequently retired.

Professional boxing record

Championships

References

External links
 

1973 births
Living people
Sportspeople from Santiago de Cuba
Cuban male boxers
Cuban emigrants to Spain
Light-welterweight boxers
Welterweight boxers
Light-middleweight boxers
Spanish male boxers